The following is a partial list of programmes shown in the United Kingdom and Ireland by the TV channel, Cartoon Network.

Current programming

Original programming

Cartoon Network Studios 
 Apple & Onion (27 August 2018)
 Craig of the Creek (1 October 2018)
 We Baby Bears (4 April 2022)

Warner Bros. Animation
 Jellystone! (1 November 2021)
 Teen Titans Go! (7 April 2014)

Acquired programming 
 Jade Armor (9 January 2023)

Reruns of Ended series

Cartoon Network Studios 
 Adventure Time (30 January 2011)
 Ben 10 (9 October 2016)
 Regular Show (28 February 2011)
 Victor and Valentino (26 August 2019)
 We Bare Bears (7 September 2015)

Hanna-Barbera Studios Europe
 The Amazing World of Gumball (2 May 2011)

Cartoonito programming

Acquired programming
 Bugs Bunny Builders (2 November 2022)
 Fireman Sam (1 March 2022)

Upcoming programming
 Tiny Toons Looniversity (TBA 2023)

Former programming
 
 2 Stupid Dogs/Super Secret Secret Squirrel (1993 - 2000)
 A Pup Named Scooby-Doo (1997 - 2003)
 A Touch of Blue on the Stars (1996 - 1998)
 Calories
 AKA Cult Toons (1998 - August 2001)
 All Dogs Go to Heaven: The Series (1997 - 2000)
 All-New Pound Puppies (1993 - 1998)
 Alvin and the Chipmunks (1994 - 1995)
 Angela Anaconda (2000 - 2002)
 Angelo Rules (29 November 2010 - 2011)
 Animaniacs (1995 - 2002)
 Aquaman (1993 - 1997)
 Arabian Knights (1993 - 1999)
 Archie's Comedy Hour (1995 - 1996)
 Archie's Fun House (1995 - 1996)
 Astro Boy (November 2005 - 12 June 2006)
 The Simpsons (1994 - 1999)
 Atom Ant (1993 - 1997)
 Atomic Betty (first broadcast 1 November 2004 - 2006)
 Augie Doggie and Doggie Daddy (1993 - 2000)
 Baby Blues (first broadcast 7 June 2002 - 2003)
 Baby Looney Tunes (June 2005 - 2006)
 Bakugan Battle Brawlers (8 September 2008 - 2010)
 Bakugan: Battle Planet (1 September 2018 - 18 November 2020)
 Bakugan: Gundalian Invaders (January 2011 - 2012)
 Bakugan: Mechtanium Surge (27 February  2012)
 Bakugan: New Vestroia (2010 - 2011)
 Banana Splits (1993 - 2000)
 Barney Bear (1994 - 1998)
 Batfink (1994 - 1997)
 Batman: The Animated Series (1993 - 2000)
 Batman: The Brave and the Bold (first broadcast April 2009;  last broadcast July 2019)
 Batman Beyond (2000 - 2003; 2006)
 Batman with Robin the Boy Wonder (1997 - 1998)
 Battle B-Daman (2005 - 2006)
 Be Cool, Scooby-Doo! (27 October 2015 - June 2016)
 Bedrock Cops (1993 - 1997)
 Beetlejuice (1995 - 2001)
 Ben 10 (4 March 2006 - 2018)
 Ben 10: Alien Force (16 February 2009 - 2013)
 Ben 10: Omniverse (2012 - 2015)
 Ben 10: Ultimate Alien (October 2010 - 2013)
 Ben 10 Ultimate Challenge/Challenge (29 October 2011 - 2012)
 Best Ed (January 2009)
 Beyblade (2003 - 2005)
 Beyblade G Revolution (June 2004)
 Beyblade V-Force (March 2004)
 Big Bag (1999 - 2000)
 Birdman and the Galaxy Trio (1993 - 1999)
 Biskitts (1993 - 1999)
 Blackstar (1995 - 1996)
 Blinky Bill (1994 - June 2001)
 Blue Submarine No. 6 (January 2001 - 2002)
 BraveStarr (1994 - 1998)
 Breezly and Sneezly (1993 - 1997)
 Bugs N Daffy (1996 - 2000)
 Butch Cassidy and the Sundance Kids (1993 - 1998)
 Camp Lazlo (November 2005 - April 20th 2007; 2007 - 2011)
 Capitol Critters (1994 - 1997)
 Captain Caveman and Son (1995 - 1996)
 Captain Caveman and the Teen Angels (1993 - 2000)
 Captain Planet and the Planeteers (1994 - 1999)
 Cartoon Cartoons (2005 - 2018)
 Casper and the Angels (1994 - 1998)
 Cattanooga Cats (1994 - 1999)
 Cave Kids (1997 - 2002)
 CB Bears (1993 - 1997)
 Challenge of the GoBots (1994 - 1999)
 Challenge of the Super Friends (1993 - 1997)
 Chowder (20 April 2009 - 2015)
 Chris Colorado (2001 - 2006)
 City of the Morks (2007 - 2009)
 Class of 3000 (2007; 2011 - 2012)
 Clarence (3 November 2014 - 18 July 2019)
 Clue Club (1993 - 1998)
 Cloudy with a Chance of Meatballs (August 2017 - February 2020)
 Coconut Fred's Fruit Salad Island
 Code Lyoko (2005 - 2006)
 Codename: Kids Next Door (October 2003 - 2009)
 Count Duckula (1994 - 1999)
 Courage the Cowardly Dog (2000 - last broadcast 31 March 2014)
 Cow and Chicken (April 1998 - 
1 April 2014)
 Cowboy Bebop (2001 - 2004)
 Christopher Crocodile (1995 - 1998)
 Cubix: Robots for Everyone (2002 - 2004)
 Cyborg 009 (2001 - 2004)
 DC Super Hero Girls (6 July 2019 - 2022)
 Da Boom Crew (5 September 2005 - 2007)
 Danger Mouse (1995 - 2001)
 Dastardly and Muttley in Their Flying Machines (1993 - 2002)
 Devlin (1993 - 1999)
 Dexter's Laboratory (March 1997 - 2008; 2009 - 2012)
 Dingbat (1993 - 1997)
 Dink, the Little Dinosaur (1993 - 2001)
 Dino and Cavemouse (1995 - 1997)
 Dirty Dawg (1993 - 1997)
 Dragon Ball (2000 - 2002)
 Dragon Ball Z (Ocean Dub) (first broadcast 6 March 2000 - 2002)
 Dragon's Lair (1993 - 1997)
 Drak Pack (1995 - 1999)
 DreamWorks Dragons (2013 - 2015)
 Droopy (1993 - 2000)
 Droopy, Master Detective (1995 - 2001)
 Duck Dodgers (2005 - 2006)
 Duel Masters (2004 - 2006)
 Dumb and Dumber (1998 - 2000)
 Dynomutt, Dog Wonder (1994 - 1999)
 Ed, Edd n Eddy (first broadcast 15 March 1999; last broadcast May 2015)
 Elliott from Earth (6 March 2021 - 3 July 2022)
 Evil Con Carne (June 2002 - 2008)
 Fangface (1993 - 1999)
 Fantastic Four (1967) (1993 - 1998)
 Fantastic Four (1978) (1994 - 1998)
 Fantastic Four: World's Greatest Heroes (2007 - 2013)
 Fantastic Voyage (1993 - 1997)
 Fat Albert and the Cosby Kids (1993 - 1997)
 Fat Dog Mendoza (first broadcast 27 February 2000 - 2006)
 Flintstone Frolics (1994 - 2000)
 Fly Tales (2000 - 2004)
 Flying Rhino Junior High (2000 - 2004)
 Foofur (1993 - 1998)
 Foster's Home for Imaginary Friends (November 2004 - 2015)
 Frankenstein, Jr. and The Impossibles (1995 - 1998)
 Freakazoid! (1999 - 2002)
 Funky Phantom (1993 - 2000)
 Funnybones (1996 - 1997)
 Gadget Boy and Heather (2003 - 2009)
 Galaxy Goof-Ups (1993 - 1999)
 Galtar and the Golden Lance (1994 - 1997)
 Garfield and Friends (1994 - 2000)
 Generator Rex (25 October 2010 - 2012)
 Ghostbusters (1997 - 1998)
 Gilligan's Planet (1993 - 1996)
 Godzilla (1998 - 2000)
 Goldie Gold and Action Jack (1993 - 1996)
 Goober and the Ghost Chasers (1993 - 1997)
 Gravedale High (1995 - 1999)
 Green Lantern: The Animated Series (2013 - 2016)
 Grim & Evil (21 September 2002 - 2006)
 Gundam Wing (2000 - 2003)
 Happy Harmonies (1993 - 1997)
 Harlem Globetrotters (1994 - 1997)
 Harry Hill's Shark Infested Custard (Fall 2011 - 2013)
 Harry Hill's TV Burp (Fall 2011 - 2013) 
 He-Man and the Masters of the Universe (October 2004 - 2006)
 Heathcliff (1994 - 1997)
 Help!... It's the Hair Bear Bunch! (1993 - 2001)
 Hero: 108 (2010; last aired July 2014)
 Hero Factory (2011 - 2012)
 Heyyy, It's the King! (1997 - 1998)
 Hi Hi Puffy AmiYumi (27 May 2005 - 2008)
 Hokey Wolf (1993 - 1997)
 Home Movies (2000 - 2003)
 Hong Kong Phooey (1993 - 2000)
 Hot Wheels AcceleRacers (November 12th 2005 - 2006)
 Hot Wheels Battle Force 5 (2010 - July 2011)
 Huckleberry Hound (1993 - 2000)
 I Am Weasel (21 April 1997 - 2008)
 I, Elvis Riboldi (19 April 2021 - 3 July 2022)
 Inch High Private Eye (1993 - 1999)
 IGPX (2006)
 It's the Wolf (1993 - 1997)
 Ivanhoe, The King's Knight (1993 - 1995)
 Jabberjaw (1993 - 2001)
 Jana of the Jungle (1996 - 1999)
 Jeannie (1994 - 1995)
 Johnny Bravo (1998 - last broadcast December 2013)
 Jonny Quest (1993 - 1997)
 Johnny Test (first broadcast 12 January 2006 - May-July 2017)
 Josie and the Pussycats (1993 - 1997)
 Josie and the Pussycats in Outer Space (1996 - 1998)
 Journey to the Center of the Earth (1995)
 Justice League (2002 - February 2005)
 Justice League Action (first broadcast 26 November 2016 - 2019)
 Justice League Unlimited (2005 - 2006)
 Kong: The Animated Series (2005)
 Krypto the Superdog (2006 - 2008)
 Laff-A-Lympics (1993 - 2000)
 Lassie's Rescue Rangers (1997 - 1998)
 Laurel and Hardy (animated series) (1994)
 Laverne and Shirley in the Army
 Legends of Spark
 Legion of Super Heroes (5 March 2007 - October 2008)
 Ninjago: Masters of Spinjitzu (21 July 2014)
 Level Up (9 March 2013 - 2014)
 Lippy the Lion & Hardy Har Har
 Little Dracula
 Long Live the Royals (2016 - 2018)
 Loonatics Unleashed (22 April 2006 - 23 May 2007)
 Looney Tunes/Merrie Melodies (1993 - 2003)
 Loopy De Loop
 Lucas the Spider
 Lucky Luke
 Masha and the Bear
 Make, Shake & Jake (2 May 2009 - 30 June 2021)
 Mao Mao: Heroes of Pure Heart (2 March 2020 - 30 June 2021)
 Megas XLR (2005 - 2008)
 Mighty Magiswords (2017 - 2019)
 Mighty Man and Yukk
 Mighty Mightor
 Mighty Orbots
 Mike, Lu and Og (5 July 2000 - 2006; 2008)
 Mission: Magic!
 Mister T
 Mixels (21 May 2014 - January 2015)
 Moby Dick
 Monchichis
 Monster Allergy (17 May 2008)
 Monster Beach (5 July 2021 - 3 July 2022)
 Motormouse and Autocat
 Mr Bean: The Animated Series (2011 - 2012; 2021)
 Mucha Lucha! (3 February 2003 - 2006) 
 My Favorite Martians (1995 - 1998)
 My Gym Partner's a Monkey (2006 - 2011)
 Ned's Newt (2000 - December 2006)
 Nexo Knights (2016 - 2018)
 OK K.O.! Let's Be Heroes (11 September 2017 - 2020)
 Omer and the Starchild (1996 - 2001)
 One Piece (May 2005 - 23 May 2007)
 Outlaw Star (2001 - 2004)
 Over the Garden Wall (2015 - 2016)
 Ozzy and Drix (2003 - 2005)
 Pac-Man
 Paul in Fantasy Land
 Partridge Family 2200 A.D.
 Paw Paws
 Pet Alien (15 January 2005 - 2006)
 Peter Potamus
 Pink Panther and Sons
 Pinky and the Brain
 Pinky, Elmyra & the Brain
 Pixie and Dixie and Mr. Jinks
 Plastic Man
 Pokémon (October 2005 - 2008)
 Popeye
 Popeye and Son
 Potsworth & Co.
 Pound Puppies
 Power Players (3 February 2020 - 3 July 2022)
 Punkin' Puss & Mushmouse
 Quick Draw McGraw
 Rave Master (February 2005 - 24 April 2006)
 ReBoot (1997 - 2001)
 Redakai: Conquer the Kairu (March 2012)
 Richie Rich
 Rickety Rocket
 Ricochet Rabbit & Droop-a-Long
 Road Rovers (1999 - 2001)
 Robotboy (first broadcast 1 November 2005; last broadcast 21 July 2017)
 Samurai Jack (2002 - 1 April 2014)
 Scooby Doo and Scrappy Doo
 Scooby-Doo and Scrappy-Doo (shorts) (1997 - 2008)
 Scooby-Doo! Mystery Incorporated (February 2011 - 2012)
 Scooby-Doo, Where Are You!
 Scooby-Doo and Guess Who? 
 Screwball Squirrel
 Sealab 2020 (2001 - 2004)
 Secret Squirrel
 Shaggy & Scooby-Doo Get a Clue! (2007)
 Sharky and George (1996 - 2000)
 Shazzan
 She-Ra: Princess of Power
 Sheep in the Big City (4 May 2001 - 2006)
 Shirt Tales
 Sinbad Jr. and his Magic Belt
 Sitting Ducks (October 2005)
 Skatebirds (1996 - 1997)
 Skatoony (2006 - 18 July 2019)
 Sky Commanders
 Snagglepuss
 Snooper and Blabber
 Space Ghost
 Space Ghost Coast to Coast (1996 - 2004)
 Space Kidettes
 Space Stars
 Spaced Out (19 November 2001 - 2004)
 Spartakus and the Sun Beneath the Sea
 Speed Buggy
 Speed Racer
 Speed Racer X
 Spider Man (1995 - 1997)
 Spider-Man (1995 - 1998)
 Spider-Man and his Amazing Friends
 Squiddly Diddly
 Squirrel Boy (2007 - 2009; 2012)
 Star Wars: Clone Wars (2004 - 2006)
 Star Wars: The Clone Wars (14 February 2009 - 2013)
 Static Shock (2005 - 2006)
 Steven Universe (6 May 2014 - 18 November 2020)
 Steven Universe Future (23 December 2019 - 30 June 2021)
 Storm Hawks (first broadcast 6 August 2007 - 2009)
 Street Fighter
 Street Fighter II V
 Summer Camp Island (4 March 2019 - 3 July 2022) (currently on CBBC)
 Super Friends 
 Super Friends 
 Super Friends: The Legendary Super Powers Show
 Superman (1997 - 1998)
 Superman: The Animated Series (1998 - 2000)
 Supernoobs (November 2015 - 
17 July 2019)
 SWAT Kats: The Radical Squadron (1996 - 2001)
 Sym-Bionic Titan (March 2012)
 Tabaluga (first broadcast 7 September 1998 - 2002)
 Tarzan, Lord of the Jungle
 Taz-Mania (1997-1999)
 Teen Titans (2005 - September 2008)
 Tenchi Muyo! (first broadcast 5 February 2001 - last broadcast 7 September 2003)
 These Are the Days
 The 13 Ghosts of Scooby-Doo
 The Addams Family  
 The Addams Family  
 The Adventures of Batman
 The Adventures of Batman & Robin
 The Adventures of Don Coyote and Sancho Panda
 The Adventures of Gulliver
 The Adventures of Rocky and Bullwinkle and Friends
 The Adventures of Superboy
 The All-New Super Friends Hour
 The Amazing Adrenalini Brothers (2007)
 The Amazing Chan and the Chan Clan
 The Archie Show
 The Batman (2006 - 2008)
 The Brady Kids
 The Brak Show (2001 - 2004)
 The Big O (2004)
 The Buford Files
 The Bugs Bunny Show
 The Centurions
 The Charlie Brown and Snoopy Show
 The Completely Mental Misadventures of Ed Grimley (1995 - 1997)
 The Cramp Twins (first broadcast 3 September 2001; last broadcast  1 April 2014)
 The Dukes
 The Fabulous Funnies
 The Flintstone Kids
 The Flintstones
 The Frankenstones
 The Fruitties
 The Fungies! (2 November 2020 - 3 July 2022)
 The Gary Coleman Show
 The Great Grape Ape Show
 The Grim Adventures of Billy and Mandy (May 2003 - December 2016)
 The Groovie Goolies
 The Herculoids
 The Heroic Quest of the Valiant Prince Ivandoe (13 February 2018)
 The Hillbilly Bears
 The Incredible Hulk
 The Jackson 5ive
 The Jetsons
 The Kid Super Power Hour
 The Kwicky Koala Show
 The Life and Times of Juniper Lee (20 August 2005 - 2008)
 The Little Rascals
 The Magic Roundabout
 The Magilla Gorilla Show
 The Marvel Super Heroes
 The Marvelous Misadventures of Flapjack (2009 - 2013)
 The Mask: The Animated Series
 The Moomins
 The Moxy Show
 The Mumbly Cartoon Show
 The New Adventures of Batman
 The New Adventures of Captain Planet
 The New Adventures of Flash Gordon
 The New Adventures of Gilligan
 The New Adventures of He-Man
 The New Adventures of Huckleberry Finn
 The New Adventures of Superman
 The New Adventures of Zorro
 The New Batman Adventures
 The New Batman/Superman Adventures (22 February 1999 - 2000)
 The New Fred and Barney Show
 The New Scooby and Scrappy-Doo Show
 The New Scooby Doo Movies
 The New Scooby-Doo Mysteries
 The New Shmoo
 The New Yogi Bear Show
 The Pebbles and Bamm-Bamm Show
 The Perils of Penelope Pitstop
 The Pink Panther (1995 - 2001)
 The Pink Panther Show
 The Pirates of Dark Water
 The Plucky Duck Show
 The Porky Pig Show
 The Powerpuff Girls (1999 - 2012)
 The Powerpuff Girls (Reboot) (4 April 2016 - 18 July 2019)
 The Raccoons (1995 - 2001)
 The Real Adventures of Jonny Quest (1996 - 2000; 2003 - 2004)
 The Real Story of... (1997 - 1998)
 The Road Runner Show'
 The Roman Holidays The Ruff and Reddy Show The Scooby-Doo Show The Secret Saturdays (2009)
 The Smurfs The Snorks The Super Globetrotters The Super Powers Team: Galactic Guardians The Three Musketeers The Tidings The Tom and Jerry Show (2014 - 2016)
 The Transformers The World's Greatest Super Friends The Zeta Project (2002 - 2004)
 Thomas & Friends (1995 - 2001) 
 Thundarr the Barbarian Thunderbirds ThunderCats ThunderCats (first broadcast 10 September 2011 - 2013)
 ThunderCats Roar (6 April 2020 - 2021)
 Time Squad (August 2002 - 2008)
 Tiny Toon Adventures Tom and Jerry (1993 - 2003)
 Tom & Jerry Kids (1995 - 2002)
 ToonHeads Top Cat Touché Turtle and Dum Dum Transformers: Cybertron (2005 - 2006)
 Transformers: Cyberverse (2018 - 2020)
 Transformers: Prime (2011 - December 2015)
 Transformers: Robots in Disguise (16 February 2015 - 2018)
 Trollkins (1993 - 1997)
 Turbo Teen (1996)
 Uncle Grandpa (1 April 2014 - 18 November 2020)
 Undercover Elephant Underdog Unikitty! (5 March 2018 - 30 June 2021)
 Valley of the Dinosaurs VBirds (April 2003 - 2004)
 Wacky Races (2018)
 Wait Till Your Father Gets Home Wally Gator Waynehead (1998 - 2000)
 Welcome to Earth (3 December 2022 - 1 January 2023)
 What a Cartoon! (1996 - 2000)
 Whatever Happened to Robot Jones? (5 January 2004 - 2008)
 What's New, Scooby-Doo? (11 April 2005 - 31 October 2022)
 Wheelie and the Chopper Bunch Wildfire (1996 - 1998)
 Wishfart (2018)
 Winsome Witch X-Men: Evolution (2001 - 2004)
 Xiaolin Chronicles (2014 - 2016)
 Xiaolin Showdown (2004 - 2006)
 Yakky Doodle Yippee, Yappee and Yahooey Yo Yogi! Yogi Bear 
 Yogi's Gang Yogi's Space Race Yogi's Treasure Hunt Yo-kai Watch (2016 - 2017)
 Young Justice (February 2013 - 2015)
 Young Robin Hood Yu-Gi-Oh! Zexal (June 2013 - 2014)
 YuYu Hakusho (2000 - 2004)

Movies

 A Boy Named Charlie Brown The BFG (2000 - 2004)
 All Dogs Go to Heaven An All Dogs Christmas Carol An American Tail An American Tail: Fievel Goes West An American Tail: The Treasure of Manhattan Island An American Tail: The Mystery of the Night Monster Bartok the Magnificent Bon Voyage, Charlie Brown (and Don't Come Back!!) Casper Casper: A Spirited Beginning Casper Meets Wendy Casper Scare School Cats & Dogs Cats Don't Dance Chitty Chitty Bang Bang The Fearless Four FernGully: The Last Rainforest FernGully 2: The Magical Rescue The Flight of Dragons The Flintstones
 The Flintstones in Viva Rock Vegas
 Gay Purr-ee (2000 - 2003)
 The Goonies
 Journey Back to Oz
 The Land Before Time (2000 - 2006)
 Madeline
 Matilda
 Millionaire Dogs
 Once Upon a Forest
 Osmosis Jones
 The Pagemaster
 The Pebble and the Penguin
 The Phantom Tollbooth
 Pinocchio 3000
 Popeye's Voyage: The Quest for Pappy
 Race for Your Life, Charlie Brown
 Rover Dangerfield (2000 - 2004)
 The Secret of NIMH
 The Secret of NIMH 2: Timmy to the Rescue
 Snoopy Come Home'
 Stanley's Magic Garden
 The Swan Princess
 The Swan Princess II: Escape from Castle Mountain
 The Swan Princess III: The Mystery of the Enchanted Kingdom
 Tom Sawyer
 The Trumpet of the Swan
 Watership Down
 Willy Wonka & the Chocolate Factory
 The Wind in the Willows

See also
 List of programs broadcast by Cartoon Network (United States)
 List of programs broadcast by Boomerang in the UK

Notes

References

British television-related lists
UK and Ireland
Cartoon Network-related lists